The Wasserman Award is NYU Film School’s top honor in recognition for outstanding achievement in film. The award honors the late Lew Wasserman and his wife Edie, major benefactors of the Tisch School of the Arts. Past winners include Spike Lee, Ang Lee, and Nancy Savoca.

References

American film awards
New York University